Deiva Thirumagal  is a 2011 Indian Tamil-language melodrama film written and directed by A. L. Vijay and produced by M. Chinthamani and Ronnie Screwvala that features Vikram in the lead role as a mentally disabled adult with the maturity of a five-year-old boy who has an intellectual disability and a mental disorder while Sara Arjun, Anushka Shetty, Amala Paul, Nassar, Santhanam, and Sachin Khedekar playing pivotal roles.

The film comprises director Vijay's regular technical crew with G. V. Prakash Kumar as music composer, Nirav Shah as cinematographer and Anthony as editor. Audiography was done by M. R. Rajakrishnan. The film released on 15 July 2011. The film was later released in Japan as Kamisama ga Kureta Musume. The film is a remake of the 2001 American film I Am Sam starring Sean Penn as a father with a developmental disability and Dakota Fanning as daughter.

Plot 
Krishna is an intellectually disabled man and has the mental ability of a five-year-old. He lives a peaceful life in the hill station of Ooty. He is cared for by Victor, the owner of a chocolate factory where Krishna works. One day, he excitedly announces to the village that he will become a father. That night, his daughter is born, but his wife Banumathy dies during childbirth.

Unable to grasp the concept of death, Krishna simply accepts that Banumathy has "gone to God" and starts life as a father. He names his daughter Nila and raises her with love and care. She soon grows into a happy young girl. With the help of Victor and his other mentally disabled friends, Krishna enrolls Nila in school where she adjusts herself to school life and befriends the correspondent Shwetha Rajendran, who develops a maternal bond with her.

When she sees Nila with Krishna and learns that Nila is his daughter, she recognizes Krishna from a photo that her sister had shown of her lover. She realizes that Nila is her niece. Shwetha refuses to let Nila stay with Krishna as she is scared that he might unintentionally hurt her. Soon, a scuffle ensues between Krishna and Shwetha's fiancé Karthik.

It is broken up by Shwetha's father Rajendran, who reveals that his other daughter was Banumathy, who became estranged from him upon choosing to marry Krishna. He offers to take Krishna and Nila with him and claims that they are part of his family. Victor agrees and sends them with Rajendran. At a distance from Chennai, Rajendran tricks Krishna into exiting the car and abandons him.

Distraught, Krishna wanders around the city asking passersby where Nila is. He eventually arrives at a court, where he meets lawyer Vinod, who assumes that Krishna is a rich person and promises him that his boss will defend him. He introduces him to his boss, Anuradha Ragunathan, who is hesitant to take up the case as she believes Krishna to be a lunatic, but Victor arrives and explains Krishna's predicament, which makes Anu to help Krishna and takes up the case.

Anu files a case against Rajendran but loses hope when she learns that Rajendran's lawyer is Bashyam, a feared senior lawyer who has never lost a case. The case is then heard in the high court, with both parties arguing to the child's custody. Finally, Bashyam asks Krishna about how he can raise his daughter and support her financially.

After a quick show of father-daughter connection and affection, Bashyam withdraws the case voluntarily, thereby giving the custody of Nila to Krishna, and leaves the court. After spending some time with his daughter, Krishna takes her back to Shwetha so that she can have financial stability and that she can become a doctor when she grows up. Later, Krishna returns to work at Victor's chocolate factory.

Cast 

 Vikram as Krishna
 Sara Arjun as Nila Krishna
 Anushka Shetty as Anuradha Ragunathan
 Nasser as Bashyam
 Amala Paul as Swetha Rajendran
 Santhanam as Vinod
 Sachin Khedekar as Rajendran
 Krishna Kumar as Victor
 M. S. Bhaskar as Murthy
 Mahendran as Ragunathan
 Pandi as Muruga
 T. M. Karthik as Krishna's friend
 George Maryan as Krishna's friend
 Surekha Vani as Murthy's wife
 Rethika Srinivas as Bashyam's wife
 M. R. Kishore Kumar 
 Gadam Kishan as Muttakannan
 Ravi Venkatraman as Dr. Basheer
 Tulasi as Priya
 Karthik Kumar as Karthik (Guest appearance)

Production

Development 
The production of the film took five months from start to finish, however, Vijay claimed that the film had been in his plans for four years, but he waited for Vikram to give him dates. With A. L. Vijay and Vikram confirming their presence in the project, the producers failed in attempts to persuade Vidya Balan to appear in the film. In October 2010, Anushka Shetty agreed to appear in the lead female role in the film after agreeing terms. Amala Paul, who appeared in the lead role in Mynaa, was signed in November 2010. She had signed on in place of Meera Jasmine, who opted out of the film before production began. Despite reports that Divya Spandana joined the cast of the film in early 2011, Vijay refuted the claim as a rumour. The film saw the collaboration of several technicians who had worked in Vijay's earlier film Madrasapattinam, with G. V. Prakash Kumar as music composer, Nirav Shah as cinematographer and Anthony as editor. Santhanam was appointed as art director, whilst Deepali Noor took charge of costumes. Sara had appeared in a commercial for Vijay when she was two but he then lost touch with Sara's family, before he met them and cast Sara in Deiva Thirumagal, following a visit to Mumbai.

The film proceeded without an official title until April 2011, with several possibilities announced during the production period. The film was tentatively titled Deiva Magan (Son of God), a title from a 1969 film featuring Sivaji Ganesan. However, problems arose after Sivaji Productions claimed that they owned the rights of the title and expressed their interest on using the name for a future production featuring Sivaji's grandson, Vikram Prabhu. The title Pitha (Father) also ran into trouble after a debutant team announced that they had registered the title, and the title Deiva Thirumagan also created controversies, but subsequently the film was christened as Deiva Thirumagal in March 2011.

Filming 
The film was predominantly across the hill country settings in Ooty throughout late 2010, with a chocolate factory being constructed as a set by art director Santhanam. Scenes were also shot within Chennai, with the Chennai High Courtroom being reproduced for a scene in the film. The team of the film returned to Ooty in February 2011 to complete the final schedule, after which the film was completed. In order to perfect his portrayal of a mentally disabled adult with the maturity of a five-year-old boy, Vikram visited Vidya Sagar, a school for children with special needs, to learn and study the behavior of such children.

Marketing 
After completing the film with little publicity, the film met the press at Raintree Hotel St Mary's Road in Chennai on 3 April 2011 to launch the title and logo, the teaser trailer and three twenty-second promotional videos of the film. The event was attended by technicians and actors from the film, with the teaser trailer drawing acclaim and positive reviews from film critics.

Themes and influences
Despite film's director A. L. Vijay denying it, many critics believed the film was heavily inspired from Jessie Nelson's 2001 drama film I Am Sam. Malathi Rangarajan of The Hindu stated that "Those who have watched the Sean Penn stunner, I am Sam, and Dustin Hoffman's autistic travel in Rain Man can easily spot the similarities between them and DT" [..] and it "reminds you of Balu Mahendra's inimitable Moondraam Pirai. And at times Kamal's Guna".  The director A.L. Vijay has said that the film is about his cousin's rea life story and this is not a remake film.

Messages to society and moral 
One of the social message that the film conveys is, treat disable people as everyone. They are mentally and physically strong. Moreover, they have feeling and emotions as everyone. The director A. L. Vijay wants to another message which is " Love is Life ".

According to Anushka Shetty who has taken the lawyer role in the film has been giving a messages to all women."Every woman should be professionally independent. Also, she has asked every women to be physically and mentally strong and do not fear to face challenges and protect theirself."

Soundtrack

The film score and soundtrack for Deiva Thirumagan is composed by G. V. Prakash Kumar, collaborating with director Vijay for the third time after the success of Kireedam and Madrasapattinam. The soundtrack album released on 17 June 2011, at the Chennai Trade Centre.

The director focused deeply on each and every step of the film. Cinematography for instance. The film not only stirs the emotions also, there are comedy.

There are allegations that the song "Jagada Thom" has been taken from Amaan Ali Khan and Ayaan Ali Khan's 2007 song "Truth" from the album of the same name. The song "Pa Pa Pappa" is partially based on  "Whistle-Stop" from Robin Hood (1973).

Critical response 

The soundtrack album received positive reviews from music critics. Richard Mahesh from Behindwoods.com gave a rating of 3/5 and quoted "It's realms of G.V. Prakash again as the young music director strikes with a brilliant composition. On the whole, every song in 'Deiva Thirumagan' has chances of getting ennobled as the best numbers. As of now, 'Vizhigalil Oru Vaanavil', 'Vennilave' and 'Aarariro' deserve special mention for the heavenly work by entire team." describing the music as a "Genuinely pleasing piece." Pavithra Srinivasan from Rediff also gave a score of 3/5 and described the music as "touching" further saying "Deiva Thirumagan has numbers that fit in, almost formulaic fashion, with the angst and emotion that's required of a movie like this. The good thing is that G V Prakash, despite going with tried and trusted tunes, manages to make them melodious and touching. Go for it." Another portal, Indiaglitz said "It would be cliched to say that the duo has recreated its Kireedam and Madraspattinam magic in Deiva Thirumagan, the Vikram starrer. For the album sets a new benchmark in terms of a complete fusion and certain new things have been attempted all through. To sum it up, songs from Deiva Thirumagan is a treat to music lovers and a feast to the fans of Vikram and GVP."

Release 
Though initially planned to be released in 400-500 screens in India alone, the film was released by UTV only across 250 screens in Tamil Nadu and another 50 in North India. The premier of the film took place in Dubai.

Reception

Critical response 
The film received positive reviews. CNN-IBN gave three and a half out of five, lauding Vijay for "having handled the emotional sequences with maturity", further adding that "his creative grip over the medium and the subject lifts the movie to higher levels despite some flaws and slow narrative." Behindwoods.com called it an "emotional tale between a father and a daughter well told", giving it three and a half as well. Sify noted that it was Vikram's "best work in years", further writing: "You can feel the earnestness of his intentions and the wetness of his tears. He is able to nail the character's boyish charm and innocence like sunshine and his restraint in the courtroom scene and his poignant dialogues in the climax, is heart breaking". S. Viswanath from the Deccan Herald stated that "Deiva Thirumagan, with A L Vijay [...] proving his mettle and supported by his glorious team, ensures it's worth the ticket money", labelling it as a "not-to-be missed, must-see movie." D.I. Aravindan from nowrunning rated it three and a half stating that "despite some flaws and slow narrative in the first half, the movie turns out to be worth watching -- thanks to some extraordinary performances and emotional strength". Chennai Online cited it was a "stand-out film" that "works a big way with its sensitive approach, good music, spectacular cinematography, and excellent performances". Malathi Rangarajan from The Hindu called it "a sensitive poem on celluloid" that "showcases paternal instinct in all its poignancy" further citing that "Vijay provides enough fodder for this veritable storehouse of talent, and the actor gobbles it up with glee". She heaped praise on Vikram stating "an antithesis almost, but temerity or timidity, the actor accomplishes the task assigned, with élan."

However, the film also received mixed response from other critics. Rohit Ramachandran of nowrunning rated it two and a half describing the film as a "well-made crowd pleasing family entertainer with a developmental disability that gets mentally taxing for the audience towards the end." Pavithra Srinivasan from Rediff also rated it two and a half, praising Vikram's performance, while citing that "if you're a fan of sentimental tear-jerkers, and have not seen I am Sam, Deiva Thirumagal might impress. For the rest, it might provide a sense of déjà vu, and towards the end, the meandering, weak screenplay is largely dissatisfying."

Box office 
In Chennai, the film collected 80 lakh in the first three days with around 100% occupancy in theaters. After one week, the collections were around 2.53 crore with the average occupancy being 90%. After six weeks, it had collected 7.01 crore from Chennai and was declared a super hit but at the Kollywood box office. The film completed 100-day run at the box office.

Accolades

Notes

References

External links 
 

2011 films
Films set in Chennai
Films about disability in India
Indian courtroom films
Films shot in Ooty
Films directed by A. L. Vijay
Films scored by G. V. Prakash Kumar
2010s Tamil-language films
UTV Motion Pictures films
Indian remakes of American films